Sheridan Gray Snyder OBE (born October 20, 1936) is an entrepreneur, venture capitalist, and philanthropist in the biotechnology industry. He is the founder and CEO of Biocatalyst, but also a "serial entrepreneur", a founder of Genzyme and many other companies. Snyder, who was the University of Virginia's best tennis player when he was studying for his BA in French and Romance Languages there in the 1960s, made "major contributions to the popularisation of tennis in the USA." He co-founded the National Junior Tennis League that reaches 250,000 inner-city young people and constructed a new tennis center at the University of Virginia.

Beginnings

Education
Snyder graduated from The Lawrenceville School in New Jersey and is a 1958 graduate of The University of Virginia with a Bachelor of Arts in French & Romance Languages. At UVa, Snyder was a member of the SPE social fraternity.  Snyder received an Honorary Doctorate of Law degree from the University of Dundee in 2002.

Early Business Career

Upon graduation from UVA, Snyder began his career as a Credit Analyst for New York Trust Corporation.

Venture capitalist

Ed Glassmeyer, Senior Manager of the venture capital firm Oak Partners, funded many of Snyder's early start-up companies, mainly in electronics. Glassmeyer, a Princeton graduate, began in venture capitalism in 1968 to 1970 at CitiCorp Venture Capital. By 1978 he co-founded  Oak Investment Partners with Stewart Greenfield and became Managing Partner.

Cambridge Machine Corporation
Snyder's start-up Cambridge Machine Corporation, initiated the development and invention of high-speed mailing/envelope inserting machines. By 1970 Snyder had sold Cambridge Machine Corporation to Pitney-Bowes and he began working for them as National Sales Account manager.

Instapak
In 1971, Snyder founded a start-up packaging company, Instapak, funded by venture capitalist, Ed Glassmeyer. Instapak markets "foam-in-place packaging"—revolutionary for its time— that creates a protective barrier for heavy, fragile instrumentation and computer systems. Instapak is now the largest division of Sealed Air Corporation (NYSE: SEE), with more than 5,500 employees and revenues of $1 billion.

Biotechnology
In 1981, Glassmeyer's entry into the then-embryonic biotechnology industry by starting up Genzyme—a biotechnology firm—was in response to Glassmeyer's challenge.

Genzyme
In its earliest moments "Genzyme was just really the combination" of Snyder and Henry Blair, a technician at the New England Enzyme Center at Tufts Medical School, who had worked for  Roscoe Brady at the National Institute of Health (NIH). According to Snyder, he and Blair "started developing a business on our own." Blair had a contract with the National Institutes of Health (NIH) to produce modified enzymes for the NIH and test it in clinical trials. Roscoe and his colleagues had been working on a treatment for Gaucher's disease for over a decade at that time. Snyder was transformed by the idea that entrepreneurs could "actually help people and save some lives."

Genzyme's first office was an old clothing warehouse adjacent to Tufts Medical School.

Snyder served as Genzyme's first Chairman, President and CEO until Henri Termeer was appointed as CEO in 1985. In 1988 Termeer took over as Genzyme's Chairman.

By 1983 Genzyme interviewed Baxter employee Henri Termeer, who had completed his MBA at Snyder's alma mater, the University of Virginia in 1973. By that time Genzyme had seventeen employees who worked in an old clothing warehouse adjacent to Tufts Medical School. Genzyme also had a small diagnostics operation in England.

Bio Information Associates (BIA)

By 1983 Genzyme developed close ties with a group of entrepreneurial professors from MIT and Harvard. These "well-known, full professors who had a lot of multidisciplinary post-docs" had formed a successful Boston-based business management consulting firm a Bio Information Associates (BIA) in 1980. As Termeer described it, "Genzyme was just these professors from MIT and myself and some venture capitalists."

One of these professors was a Harvard chemistry professor, George M. Whitesides who founded many companies. He is considered to be Genzyme's co-founder.

In 1986, Snyder initiated the first sale of Genzyme stock shares (Initial Public Offering).

"In the formative years of biotechnology, Genzyme was the industry’s Apple, blazing a pathway for creating protein-based treatments for rare diseases." Genzyme’s business focused on enzyme deficiency diseases. It first produced diagnostic enzymes for victims of Gaucher's disease, a rare chronic disorder causing enormous enlargement of the spleen, a change in skin pigmentation and bone lesions. It afflicts 10,000 young Hasidic Jews each year.  It currently employs 10,000 people worldwide, with approximately $3.6 billion in revenues, with a market valuation of $20 billion. Genzyme (NASDAQ:GENZ) is the largest private employer in Boston, Massachusetts.

Biotage
Snyder founded Biotage in 1989 which focuses on the development of novel drug development systems. Biotage was acquired by the Swedish biotechnology company Pyrosequencing in 2004 which then took the name Biotage AB.

Upstate
In 1994 Snyder founded Argonex a small biotech start-up in Charlottesville, Virginia. In 1996, Snyder founded and served as chairman and chief executive officer of Upstate Biotechnology Incorporated, merging it with Argonex. Upstate Inc. develops cell signaling products, technology platforms and services. Upstate was sold to Serologicals Corporation in 2004 for $205 million.

BioCatalyst International

In 2005 Snyder founded Biocatalyst International, to create biotech firms in partnership with scientists, such as Xcovery, which he co-founded with Chris Liang, Director of Medicinal Chemistry, Scripps Research Florida, and co-developer of Sutent, Pfizer’s first small molecule oncology drug.

Molecular MD was co-founded with Brian Druker, inventor of Gleevec, director of the cancer center at the Oregon Health Sciences University in Portland. Oregon. Gleevec is a small-molecule drug that prevents and stops the growth of cancer cells in chronic myeloid leukemia (CML). MMD is a molecular diagnostic company developing personalized medicine utilizing sensitive detection systems.

Awards

In 1999, the State of Virginia honored Snyder with its Biotechnology Lifetime Achievement Award.

In 2003, he was appointed to Scotland’s International Advisory Board and serves as an advisor to the Scottish government on the development of its biotech sector. In this capacity, Snyder played a role with the development of an  bioscience translational center outside Edinburgh.

Snyder was honored OBE (Officer of the Order of the British Empire) in 2005 by HM Queen Elizabeth II of the United Kingdom on the advice of the British government.

Board of directors

He is a member of the board of trustees – along with William C. Battle, Arthur Garson Jr, William Black, Sheridan G. Snyder, Patricia J. Edgerton, Aaron Shatkin and Robert W. Battle – of the Ivy Charitable Foundation, which was created in 2000 and has been a benefactor of the University of Virginia's biomedical programs. In 2005 the Ivy Charitable Foundation donated "$45 million to the University of Virginia Health System to expand laboratory space for biomedical research and to speed the translation of new discoveries into effective treatments and cures." This gift was used to construct a new Children's Hospital, the Emily Couric Cancer Center and the Sheridan G. Snyder Translational Research Center.

Philanthropy

Tennis

Snyder funded and developed the National Junior Tennis League (NJTL), along with the encouragement and support of Arthur Ashe and Charles Pasarell. Snyder supported the NJTL for 15 years. This organization now operates, through the USTA, in 110 cities and reaches 250,000 inner-city youths.

In 1988, Snyder was the founder, chairman and CEO of Compuflo Inc., which developed a specialty high-end computer program used to analyze airflow to aid the design of aircraft and autos, a company donated to the University of Virginia to support its laboratories. Snyder also funded University Technology Corporation, where companies were formed with University of Virginia technology and the proceeds generated by these business ventures were donated back to the University.

In 1995 Snyder contributed to the construction of a new tennis center at the University of Virginia which was named the Sheridan Snyder Tennis Center.

In 2008 Snyder received the Intercollegiate Tennis Association Achievement Award for achievements outside the game of tennis.

References

1936 births
Living people
People from Long Island
University of Virginia alumni
Lawrenceville School alumni